MKT may refer to:

 M. K. Thyagaraja Bhagavathar, an Indian actor
 Minkuotang, a political party in Taiwan
 Lincoln MKT, a car

Transport 
 Mankato Regional Airport, IATA and FAA codes
 Marks Tey railway station, National Rail station code
 Missouri–Kansas–Texas Railroad, a defunct United States railroad
 MKT Trail, in the railroad's right-of-way
 Emkaytee Airfield, Australia

Science and technology 
 Mean kinetic temperature
 , 1935 texts by Otto E. Neugebauer